Buffaloes F.C. are a Zimbabwean football club based in Mutare. They play in the top division of Zimbabwean football, the Zimbabwe Premier Soccer League.

League participations
Zimbabwe Premier Soccer League: 2012–
Zimbabwean Second Division: ?-2012

Stadium
Currently the team plays at the 10000 capacity Sakubva Stadium.

References

External links
Soccerway
Soccer24

Football clubs in Zimbabwe